Runic inscriptions are found throughout the Swedish island of Öland. Numbering and abbreviations are done in agreement with Rundata.

Öland's runic inscriptions
Öl 1, Karlevi Runestone
Öl 18, Seby, Segerstads socken
Öl 21, Hulterstads kyrka, Hulterstads socken
Öl 22, Hulterstads kyrka, Hulterstads socken se Öl 21
Öl 25, Björnflisan, utanför Dröstorp på Alvaret, runestone
Öl 26, Sandby kyrkogård, Sandby socken, runestone
Öl 27, Sandby kyrkogård, Sandby socken, runestone
Öl 28, Gårdbystenen vid Gårdby kyrka, Gårdby socken, runestone
Öl 29, Gårdby kyrka, Gårdby socken, runestone fragment
Öl 31, Runstens kyrka, sakristian, Runstens socken
Öl 36, Bjärbystenen, Runstens socken, runestone
Öl 37, Lerkaka, Runstens socken (mittemot kvarnraden)
Öl 39, Övra Bägby, Gärdslösa socken, (stenen söder om bäcken) 
Öl 40, Övra Bägby, Gärdslösa socken, (stenen norr om bäcken) 
Öl 43, Gärdslösa kyrka, vapenhuset, Gärdslösa socken, runestone fragment 
Öl 44, ursprungligen från Bo, Bredsättra socken, now in the Skedemosse museum
Öl 46, Tingsflisan, Köpings socken, runestone
Öl ATA4684/43B, Hulterstads kyrka, see Öl 21
Öl ATA4701/43, Alböke kyrka (intill ytterväggen)
Öl ATA4703/43, Solberga Köpings socken 
Öl Fv1972;268, medeltida putsristning i Gärdslösa kyrka, Gärdslösa socken
Öl KALM1982;57, Mörbylånga kyrka. Mörbylånga socken 
Öland runic inscription Köping, de 69(?) runstensfragmenten i Köpings kyrka

External links, references
FMIS sökning: Öland, Runristning
Christer Hamp: Gamla Runinskrifter#Öland
www.olanningen.com/fornlamningar/runstenar.htm
Söderberg, Sven; Erik Brate (1900-1906). Sveriges runinskrifter: I. Ölands runinskrifter. Stockholm: Kungl. Vitterhets Historie och Antikvitets Akademien. ISSN 0562-8016. LIBRIS 148319
Nilsson, Bruce: The Runic Inscriptions of Öland (1973), Akademisk avhandling. University of Michigan

Runestones in Öland